Belloy-en-Santerre (literally Belloy in Santerre) is a commune in the Somme department in Hauts-de-France in northern France.

Geography

History
An aerial photograph taken in 1967 shows the outline of a large, rectangular, south-facing Gallo-Roman villa on the site of present-day Belloy.

Population

Personalities
Alan Seeger, American poet, who had joined the French Foreign Legion, died here during the Battle of the Somme in 1916.

See also
Communes of the Somme department

References

Communes of Somme (department)